Windermere is a rural locality in the local government area of Launceston in the Launceston region of Tasmania. The 2016 census determined a population of 245 for the state suburb of Windermere.

History
Windermere was gazetted as a locality in 1963.

Geography
The Tamar River forms the southern boundary.

Road infrastructure
The C739 route (Windermere Road) enters from the east and runs west and north before exiting in the north-west.

References

Localities of City of Launceston
Towns in Tasmania